Benowa State High School (BSHS) is an independent, co-educational school, founded in 1980, located on the Gold Coast, Queensland, Australia. It is part of the Council of International Schools (CIS) and hosts exchange students from Asia, America, Africa and Europe. It started a French Immersion program in 1985 and was the first school to offer Marine Biology as a subject in the Queensland curriculum. In 2015, they commenced their Science, Technology, Engineering and Mathematics (STEM) based educational program. In 2017, the International Baccalaureate diploma program was offered to years 11 and 12, along with a preparatory course in grade 10.

Academic 
Benowa's French Immersion programme is a four-year course offered in years 7 to 10, where students are taught four of their six subjects in French: these being mathematics, French, society & environment and science. The school has recorded 11 OP1s (Overall Position) each year from 2004 to 2007, which ranks it ahead of all other secondary schools in the Gold Coast region.

Another stream in Benowa SHS is the Waldorf education Programme which aims to develop independent and "natural" learning in students, who learn at their own pace.

The STEM program at Benowa aims for students to excel in the areas of science, technology, engineering and mathematics. It is a four-year program from years 7–10 which ends with an excursion to the NASA launch site at Cape Canaveral, Florida. Each and every STEM student receives extra lessons in those categories and various opportunities including 3D printing, Rocket Launching, Coding, and more.

Benowa is known for having a large range of subjects. It has over 30 subjects which students can choose in years 10, 11 and 12. Unlike most state schools, but like some private schools, Benowa State High School groups year 10–12 as senior school, and offers Specialist Mathematics as a subject to the year 10 students.

Along with Benowa holding ATAR classes, TAFE courses and apprenticeships, Benowa is one of 76 schools in Australia to offer the International Baccalaureate program. The course is offered through grade 10, 11 and 12 and offers a wide range of subjects to choose from.

Sports 
Benowa is a constant achiever at volleyball tournaments, placing highly in most of the competitions they enter, and some students have entered the national level of competition in the event. Students also achieve high in many other sports, including tennis, swimming, athletics and touch. The school also has an athletics-inclined stream called 'Sports Excellence' which is aimed at year 7, 8 and 9 students who wish to pursue a career in athletics. It has produced athletes who have gone on to represent both state and country in a variety of sports such as: swimming, volleyball, rugby, Australian rules football, football and track & field.

Arts 
Benowa has created an innovative curriculum in the arts, called 'Arts@Benowa', which includes visual art, music, dance, drama and music. Art workshops are offered to complement formal classes.

Use of technology 
Benowa has projectors and speakers in all classrooms, allowing students to have an enhanced learning experience. Benowa has a intranet system through the BYOX (Bring Your Own Device) Program, which allows students to connect to the wifi network, access documents and files uploaded by their teachers via a Student Drive and print. Teachers are encouraged to use applications such as OneNote and Education Perfect for classwork, and sites such as TurnItIn are used for assessment.

In 2021, the school rolled-out the use of the school management system, Compass, to replace the existing IDAttend system.

School Leadership

Executive Team 
The school welcomed new principal, Alison Fahlbusch, in 2022. The school's executive leadership team includes:

 Alison Fahlbusch - Principal
 Sarah Douglas - Deputy Principal (Year 7 and 8)
 Cameron Murray - Deputy Principal (Year 9 and 10)
 Lieve Rimbaut - Deputy Principal (Year 11 and 12)
 Brendon Wolski - Deputy Principal
 Michelle Black - Business Manager

Year Level Coordinators 
In 2023, Year Level Coordinators were re-introduced.

House Structure 
Benowa State High School has eight different school houses. Students can gain house points for their house during sporting events, as well as showing behaviour that aligns with the school's four core values (respect, compassion, integrity and diligence). Between 2018 and 2022, the school operated under a 'vertical' roll mark structure based around the houses, however, in 2023 the school reverted back to a 'horizontal' structure. with the change of system, the 'Heads of House' were renamed 'House Coordinators'.

The eight houses, named after Australian Pioneers are:

Predating 2018, the original 4 homesteads (Carnarvon, Lindemann, Moreton and Girraween) had a system in which siblings were in the same homestead. This is no longer the case.

Notable alumni

Entertainment
Peter Andre (Singer)
Jamie Durie (TV Presenter and landscape designer)
Anna Torv (Actress)

Sport
Dayne Zorko (Australian Rules Football player, Brisbane Lions Captain)
Chelsea Hodges (Olympic Relay Gold Winning Swimmer)

References

High schools in Queensland
Schools on the Gold Coast, Queensland
Educational institutions established in 1980
1980 establishments in Australia
French immersion schools in Australia